Eucereon ochrota is a moth of the subfamily Arctiinae first described by George Hampson in 1905. It is found on Jamaica.

References

Moths described in 1905
ochrota